The Centre for European Volunteering (CEV) (until 1 July 2020 known as the European Volunteer Centre), established in 1992, is the European network of over 60 organisations dedicated to the promotion of, and support to, volunteers and volunteering in Europe at European, national or regional level. Through the network, CEV works to ensure that: the value of quality volunteering as an expression of Solidarity and European values is understood, supported and celebrated; policies & programmes, together with the European social environment, inspires, encourages and supports quality European Volunteering;  Individuals and organisations that are active in the volunteering and civil society sphere share, learn and are inspired from one another in the framework of CEV . In this way CEV reaches out to the many thousands of volunteers and volunteer organisations in Europe as a source of support bringing the European dimension to their work.

History

CEV's origins lie in an initiative by 7 volunteer centres, Association pour le Volontariat (Belgium),  Centre National du Volontariat (France), the National Centre for Volunteering (UK), Centro Nazionale per il Volontariato (Italy), Landelijk Steunpunt Vrijwilligerswerk (Netherlands) and Plataforma para la Promoción del Voluntariado en España (Spain). These organisations convened at a meeting organised in Lucca, Italy, in 1989, for the representatives of National and Regional Volunteer Centres from seven European countries. The outcome of the meeting was a joint declaration for increased European cooperation.

CEV was founded in February 1990 on the basis of this declaration and in 1992 was officially granted the status of “international non-profit organisation" registered under Belgian law. The  Vlaams Steunpunt Vrijwilligerswerk, Flemish Volunteer Centre, was granted the responsibility to put in place the new organisation. On 5 December 1995, CEV organised the first ever "European Day for Volunteering in the European Parliament", Brussels, Belgium, with the active support of the European Parliament, the European Commission, the Council of the European Union and UNESCO.

Between 1994 and 2002 CEV administered as Technical Assistance Office over 13 contracts of the European Commission's PHARE and TACIS-LIEN Programme in Central and Eastern Europe and the Commonwealth of Independent States (CIS) and released a series of publications within these programmes.

As of July 1, 2020, the CEV went through a process of rebranding. This rebranding consisted of changing the English name of CEV from “European Volunteer Centre” to “Centre for European Volunteering” in order to align the name with the already used acronym “CEV”, which was taken from the French name for the organisation “Centre Européen du Volontariat”. The rebranding also introduced a new logo and visual identity for the organisation, which was first used during the candidacy application stage for the European Volunteering Capital 2022.

On its 25th anniversary in 2017 CEV published a timeline of volunteering in Europe.

Member organisations
CEV full members are national and regional support centres for volunteering and organisations exercising the role of a national or regional support centre for volunteering in European countries. Full members must be not-for profit and non-governmental organisations.

Associate members are volunteer involving organisations or organisations that promote and develop volunteering in specialised field or a specific type of volunteering. Associate members act on local, regional, national or international level.

Organisation 
CEV is supported in its work by a Board and by a Secretariat team based in Brussels.

Presidents

Directors

Partnership and collaboration 
Partnership with CEV is open to any stakeholder that is willing to support CEV and its mission to contribute to the creation of an enabling political, social and economic environment for volunteering in Europe and where the full potential of volunteering can be realised.

Whilst a network itself CEV is also actively involved at European level and in international networks. CEV is a member of: EESC Liaison Group for European Civil Society, Expert Group on the Mobility of Young Volunteers, European Qualifications Framework Advisory Group, European Alliance for Volunteering, Europe Plus, Civil Society Europe, The Conference of INGOs of the Council of Europe, Impact2030.

Strategic objectives

- The value of quality volunteering as an expression of Solidarity and European values is understood, supported and celebrated

-  Policies & programmes, together with the European social environment, inspires, encourages and supports quality European Volunteering

- Individuals and organisations that are active in the volunteering and civil society sphere share, learn and are inspired from one another in the framework of CEV

- CEV is a well-run and effective organisation

Current activities

European Volunteering Capital Competition - #EVCapital 
In 2013 European Year of Citizens, CEV launched the European Volunteering Capital Competition.  This initiative aims to promote volunteering at the local level by giving recognition to municipalities that support and strengthen partnerships with volunteer centres and volunteer involving organisations and celebrate and promote volunteering and the impact made by volunteers.

Employee Volunteering European Network (EVEN) 
EVEN currently has 10 corporate members: Fundacion Telefónica, Intel, FASVOL, Fundacion Repsol, IBERDROLA, ArcelorMittal, IBM, The Moody's Foundation, Cooperatie VGS, Kellogg's and 43 volunteer involving organisations in membership.

EVEN was established by European Volunteer Centre (CEV) in 2013. This initiative aims to increase the number of employers and volunteer-involving organisations with the capacity and willingness to implement good quality employee volunteering and give greater visibility to these initiatives.

Employee Volunteering European Network (EVEN) main objectives are:
 Increase the numbers of employers and volunteer-involving organisations with the capacity and willingness to implement good quality employee volunteering,
 Give recognition and credibility to entities from all sectors that are able to implement good quality employee volunteering projects,
 Share experiences and new developments on a regular basis and have access to reliable and competent partners for employee volunteering,
 Enable affiliate members to increase their competences in employee volunteering by participating in EVEN training courses, Reports from various EVEN activities are available its website.

The CEV-EVEN Workbook, a toolkit to help volunteer-involving organisations develop employee volunteering,  (in EN & translations) can be downloaded from its website.

WISH Platform 
WISH (Welcome, Integration & Support Hub for Refugees and Asylum Seekers in Europe) is an ESC project launched in October 2018 after the CEV General Assembly. The aim of the project is to create an online platform (WISH) mapping the initiatives that offer support to migrants in Europe. This will enable refugees and asylum seekers to find sources of support and assistance, and will help the various European volunteering initiatives to provide better information and to facilitate communication between themselves and the people they wish to help.

Tandem 
Tandem was set up to help and support refugees and asylum-seekers residing in Belgium. The project aims to facilitate their opportunities to contribute to the community, and support the restoration of their dignity and autonomy through initially short-term volunteer placements at different organisations. Tandem also aims to bring the direct experience of individual refugees and asylum-seekers and the challenges facing them into NGOs. These organisations are often concerned about the situation of refugees and asylum-seekers but may not have identified opportunities to support directly individuals in their local areas

Projects 

CEV is a partner in the following projects working towards a better recognition of volunteering: CIVCIL Project, I’VE Experienced Project, LEVER Project, DESTEVA Project, GR-EAT Project, EURAVON Project, VAPOVO Project, VOLCAR Project, EVS Realm. Read more about CEV's projects here: http://www.cev.be/initiatives/projects/

Past activities 
 To promote volunteering to the general public, the media, businesses and policy-makers (e.g. through active participation in the Europe for Citizens Forum and the 2nd EU Civil Protection Forum, Contribution to a Council recommendation on mobility of young volunteers across Europe);
 To win recognition for the role and value of volunteering as an expression of active citizenship in Europe (e.g. Manifesto for Volunteering in Europe, 2006; INVOLVE Project; MOVE Project Participatory Status of Council of Europe);
 To gather and provide information on developments within the EU on volunteer related topics (e.g. Research on the Legal Status of Volunteers in Europe in collaboration with AVSO, Facts&Figures on Volunteering);
 To represent the needs and concerns of CEV members within EU policy and with international institutions (e.g. European Election Manifesto, 2009; Public Hearing on the European Year of Volunteering 2011 in the European Parliament);
 To promote the role of volunteer development centres in advancing volunteering as an expression of active citizenship (e.g. V::I::P project; Think Future Volunteer Together project);
 To conduct research on volunteering (e.g. Bibliography on Volunteering Research in Europe; the VALUE Project);
 To encourage networking between organisations and to facilitate the exchange of good practice and innovation (e.g. CEV General Assembly in Prague on Employee Volunteering with Partnership Fair; the CEV Multi-Stakeholder Forum in April 2010);
 To provide a forum for our members to find partners for European-wide projects;
 To develop strategic alliances with other key networks and organisations (e.g. the European Year of Volunteering 2011 Alliance);
 Biannual General Assemblies, conferences, seminars, workshops and meetings;
 CEV News (CEV's monthly electronic news bulletin);
 An interactive CEV Website;
 Online communication tools: Facebook, Online Community, and YouTube channel;   
 In 2012 CEV celebrated 20 years of being the voice of volunteering in Europe!

Events

Policy conferences 
CEV General Assemblies and Conferences:

2020 - Online due to the COVID-19 Pandemic, however originally intended to be in Padova, Italy

2020 - Online due to the COVID-19 Pandemic, however originally intended to be in Galway Ireland.

2019 - Brussels, Belgium

2019 - Budapest (Hungary)

2018 - Brussels, Belgium

2018 - Rijeka (Croatia)

2017 - Vienna, Austria

2017 - London, UK

2016 - Brussels, Belgium

2016 - Bucharest (Romania)

2015 Brussels, Belgium (After Zadar)

Zadar 2015

Turin 2014

Brussels 2014

Sarajevo 2013

Dublin 2013

Portugal 2012

Copenhagen 2012

Berlin 2011

Tallinn 2011

Brussels 2010

Valencia 2010 CEV Study Visits 
CEV hosts annual Study visits, often inviting participants from various member organisations into Brussels and offering the chance to experience the work CEV does first hand. These visits allow participants to become more informed on volunteering policies, programmes and practices within the context of the EU and European Union institutions. Participants, accompanied by CEV staff, had the chance to visit the main European Institution, to connect with EU Officials and MEPs, as well as get in contact with the representatives of civil society organisations. They were also introduced to CEV's activities and engagement in promoting volunteering across Europe.

Previous study visits have invited participants from Volunteering England (UK),  ProVobis (Romania), Volunteer Centres Ireland (Ireland), La Plateforme Francophone du Volontariat (Belgium) and participants from Italian CSVnet (Coordinamento Nazionale dei Centri di Servizio per il Volontariato) member organisations (CSVs) located in different regions (Lombardia, Piemonte, Sicily, Veneto and Emilia Romagna).

The 2020 Study visit was due to take place in Padova, European Volunteering Capital 2020, as part of the CEV Autumn congress, however due to the COVID-19 pandemic the congress was moved online and the study visit was no longer possible.

 Seminars 
CEV also frequently hosts and contributes to various seminars, conferences, and policy discussion roundtables in order to share best practice, information and research on volunteering, and to represent the volunteer sector in EU policy consultations. During 2020, in order to maintain this despite the COVID-19 Pandemic, many of these seminars moved from in presence discussions to online, digital webinars.

Some of these seminars in recent years have included:

-April 2016 - The Volunteer Manager: Key for Excellency in Volunteer Management, Bucharest (Romania)

-April 2017 - Developing European Volunteering Strategies, London (UK)

-9-20 April 2018- Volunteering in Culture, Rijeka (Croatia)

-21 November 2019: European Conference - Impact and lessons of ESC - Legal status, traditions and cultures of Volunteering and Solidarity in Europe, Brussels (Belgium)

-8 October 2019 : 'Solidarity and Volunteering - European Rights and Values from the bottom up', European Volunteering Capital Seminar during EU Regions

-30 January 2020: Volunteering Interest Group in the European Parliament

-19 February 2020: SDG Watch Europe General Assembly

-15 April 2020: European Solidarity Corps Stakeholder meeting (Online)

-19 June 2020: Webinar: Volunteering in events and how to keep solidarity at the heart of it

-24 July 2020: Webinar: Volunteering in Post COVID-19 Crisis: What now?

 CEV News 
"CEV News" is a monthly newsletter providing information on CEV activities, CEV members' projects, EU policies and relevant calls for proposals, events and any other relevant information for volunteer stakeholders within the CEV membership and beyond.

 Publications and reports 
CEV serves as a knowledge and research resource for volunteering, funding opportunities and practice in Europe'''. CEV regularly publishes documents including conference conclusions, annual reports and other policy statements.  Wider selection of published research and resources in relation to volunteering can be found on its website.

See also 
Association for Leaders in Volunteer Engagement (ALIVE)

Points of Light

References

External links

  CEV Policy Conferences
 Capacity Building Conferences

Volunteering
Organizations with participatory status with the Council of Europe